The Kanoê (also as the Canoe, Kapixaná and Kapixanã) are an indigenous people of southern Rondônia, Brazil, near the Bolivian border. There are two major groups of Kanoê: one residing in the region of the Guaporé River and another in the Rio Omerê Indigenous Territory. The latter consists of just five individuals following violent contact with white settlers in the last few decades. The Kanoê of the Guaporé River have also had a troubled history of interaction with colonists; significantly reduced in population, they are now largely assimilated into neighbouring indigenous and non-indigenous peoples.

Language
The Kanoê language is an isolated, almost extinct language isolate.

See also
 Genocide of indigenous peoples in Brazil
 Man of the Hole

Notes

External links
 Instituto Socioambiental - ISA at Google Cultural Institute

Indigenous peoples in Brazil
Indigenous peoples of the Amazon
Genocide of indigenous peoples of South America